Tmesisternus herbaceus is a species of beetle in the family Cerambycidae. It was described by Francis Polkinghorne Pascoe in 1862. It is known from Papua New Guinea.

References

herbaceus
Beetles described in 1862